Willow Grove is an unincorporated community in Kent County, Delaware, United States. Willow Grove is located on Delaware Route 10, southwest of Camden.

References

Unincorporated communities in Kent County, Delaware
Unincorporated communities in Delaware